Christo Milumba Bilukidi (born December 13, 1989) is a former Angolan-born Canadian professional football defensive end. He played collegiate football at Eastern Arizona College before transferring to Georgia State University where he was a two-year starter for the Panthers.

Early life
Bilukidi was born in Angola and lived in France and Brazil before his family settled in Ottawa, Ontario, Canada. He attended Franco-Cite High School before attending St.Patrick's High School, where he only played football his senior year, participating on both his high school and with the Cumberland Panthers OVFL Varsity team.  He attended and played for Eastern Arizona College in 2009 before playing for Georgia State. He was a member of Georgia State's first football team and, together with Jake Muasau, the first Panthers to play in the NFL.

Professional career
Bilukidi was drafted 21st overall in the 3rd round of the 2012 CFL Draft by the Winnipeg Blue Bombers.

Oakland Raiders
On April 28, 2012, Bilukidi became the first former Georgia State football player to be drafted into the NFL when he was chosen by the Oakland Raiders as the 189th pick overall in the sixth round of the 2012 NFL Draft. He was released by the Raiders on October 23, 2013.

Cincinnati Bengals
He signed with the Bengals on November 1, 2013. This contract was voided as Bilukidi's work visa did not transfer to another team. Once he secured proper documentation, he re-signed with the Bengals on November 21. The Bengals released Bilukidi on September 6, 2014 before their first game of the 2014 season.

Baltimore Ravens
On September 8, 2014, the Baltimore Ravens signed Bilukidi after voiding the contract of Ray Rice. On February 27, 2015, the Baltimore Ravens extended Bilukidi to a 2-year contract. Bilukidi was waived by the Ravens on October 10, 2015.

Washington Redskins
The Washington Redskins signed Bilukidi to a futures contract on January 4, 2016. He was released by the team on May 2.

References

External links
 
 Oakland Raiders bio
 Georgia State Panthers bio

1989 births
Living people
American football defensive ends
American football defensive tackles
Angolan emigrants to Canada
Angolan players of American football
Baltimore Ravens players
Canadian football defensive linemen
Canadian players of American football
Cincinnati Bengals players
Eastern Arizona Gila Monsters football players
Georgia State Panthers football players
Gridiron football people from Ontario
Oakland Raiders players
Players of Canadian football from Ontario
Canadian football people from Ottawa
Washington Redskins players